Pink Is In is a Canadian comedy television series about the barely functioning Chatsworth Hamilton Women's Prison. Created and produced by Lisa Crawford and co-created by Caroline Puzinas, the show follows the antics of both the staff and prisoners of the fictional institution. The series' main writer is Kim Lombard, who also plays the role of prison CEO, Pip Barnett.

The show features an all-Canadian cast including Elley-Ray Hennessy, Trish Rainone, Jon Welch, Margaret Lamarre, Eileen Li, Victoria Kucher, Darren Stewart-Jones, Paige Locke and Natasha Bromfield. The series was filmed entirely in Hamilton, Ontario, Canada and debuted on Bell Fibe's TV1 in January 2021.

Award-winning Canadian actor Patrick McKenna joined the cast in 2021 as Colonel Kwoka.

Pink Is In was nominated for the 2022 Toronto ACTRA Series Ensemble Award.

Jayne Eastwood appears as a special guest star in the Pink Is In Christmas Special, A Pink & Green Christmas.

As of 2023, Pink Is In can be streamed on Amazon Prime Video in the US and the UK.

References

2021 Canadian television series debuts
2020s Canadian sitcoms
Television shows filmed in Hamilton, Ontario
Canadian community channel television shows